Youthful Days is an Iranian drama series. The series is directed by Shapoor Gharib.

Storyline 
Five young students from other Iranian cities studying in Tehran rent a house and live together. Each of these five people has a different personality and they encounter a new story in each episode. But in the end, they help each other overcome the problems...

Cast 
 Keyhan Maleki
 Amin Hayai
 Nasrollah Radesh
 Behzad Khodaveisi
 Mehdi Sabaei
 Nematollah Gorji
 Zohreh Fakour Sabour
 Afsaneh Naseri
 Hassan Joharchi
 Amin Zendegani
 Sahar Sabbagh Seresht
 Biuk Mirzaei
 Siamak Ansari
 Reza Banafshehkhah
 Tooran Ghaderi
 Dariush Asadzadeh
 Homeira Riazi
 Kiumars Malekmotei
 Ramin Parchami
 Mohsen Zaehtab
 Zohreh Safavi
 Hossein Shahab
 Hamid Mehrara
 Hamid Delshakib
 Hassan Mehmani
 Farhad Khanmohammadi
 Hossein Khanibeik

References

External links
 

1990s Iranian television series
2000s Iranian television series
Iranian television series